Horacio Casarín Garcilazo (25 May 1918 – 10 April 2005) was a Mexican professional football player and coach who established himself as one of his country's most popular sports figures in the 1940s and 1950s.

A symbol for Atlante, the team Casarín served for the majority of his career, the skilled forward also played for Necaxa, León, Asturias, Club América, Real España, Monterrey and Zacatepec in his country, as well as FC Barcelona in Spain and the Mexico national team.

Club career
At age 17, Casarín debuted for Necaxa. Over the course of his career in Mexico, Casarín scored 236 goals at the amateur and professional levels (the Mexican League was founded in the early 1940s) and represented his country at the 1950 FIFA World Cup held in Brazil and scored a goal during the run of the tournament. A well-known anecdote involving Casarín takes place during a 1939 game between Casarin's Necaxa, and Asturias. After scoring a goal in the first few minutes of the game, defenders sought out Casarín and fouled him mercilessly, until the goalscorer was forced to abandon the pitch after only twenty minutes had gone by. The game ended in a 2–2 draw, but outraged Necaxa fans expressed their ire by burning Asturia's wooden stadium.

With Atlante, Casarín scored 95 goals and helped the Potros win the 1946–47 season championship, while cementing his popularity by acting in the football-themed movie, "The sons of Don Venacio". Word of Casarín's role in the film spread, and the movie became a box-office success in Mexico. Casarín played his last game as a professional on 18 November 1956, scoring a goal for CF Monterrey. He scored 174 goals in the Primera División during his career.

International career
Casarín scored 15 goals for the Mexico national team between 1937 and 1956.

Managerial career
As a coach, Casarín's biggest achievement was coaching the Mexican U-20 national football team to a second-place finish in the inaugural FIFA U-20 World Cup in Tunisia in 1977. Casarín's squad lost the final game 9–8 in penalty kicks against the USSR. He also coached Atlante and Tecos UAG.

Death
Casarín's failing health finally gave out on 10 April 2005, only a few months after his wife, Maria Elena King, had died. He died of complications arising from Alzheimer's disease.

References

External links
 

Profile at MedioTiempo

1918 births
2005 deaths
Footballers from Mexico City
Mexican people of Italian descent
Mexican people of Spanish descent
Association football forwards
Mexico international footballers
1950 FIFA World Cup players
Central American and Caribbean Games gold medalists for Mexico
Competitors at the 1938 Central American and Caribbean Games
Club Necaxa footballers
Atlante F.C. footballers
FC Barcelona players
Real Club España footballers
C.D. Veracruz footballers
Club Atlético Zacatepec players
Club América footballers
C.F. Monterrey players
Liga MX players
La Liga players
Mexican expatriate footballers
Expatriate footballers in Spain
Mexican expatriate sportspeople in Spain
Mexican football managers
Tecos F.C. managers
Atlante F.C. managers
Mexico national football team managers
Deaths from dementia in Mexico
Deaths from Alzheimer's disease
Central American and Caribbean Games medalists in football
Mexican footballers